Saint-Basile is a community in Madawaska County, New Brunswick, Canada. Formerly a separate municipality, it was amalgamated into the City of Edmundston on May 25, 1998. The 2006 Canadian Census recorded a population of 3751.

History

Notable people

See also
List of neighbourhoods in New Brunswick

References

 Community Demographics from Industry Canada

Neighbourhoods in Edmundston
Populated places disestablished in 1998
Former towns in New Brunswick
1998 disestablishments in Canada